Nikolay Uchikov (born ) is a Bulgarian male volleyball player. With his club Trentino Diatec he competed at the 2012 FIVB Volleyball Men's Club World Championship. He is part of the Bulgaria men's national volleyball team.

Sporting achievements

Club

International competitions
2012  World Championship with Trentino
 2014/2015  South American Championship with UPCN

National Championships
 2004/2005  Bulgarian Championship with Levski Sofia
 2005/2006  Bulgarian Championship  with Levski Sofia
 2008/2009  Bulgarian Championship with Levski Sofia
 2012/2013  Italian Championship with Trentino
 2014/2015  Argentine Championship with UPCN
 2015/2016  Argentine Championship with UPCN

National Cups
 2004/2005  Bulgarian Cup , with Levski Sofia
 2006/2007  Bulgarian Cup , with Levski Sofia
 2012/2013  Italian Cup , with Trentino
 2015/2016  Argentine Cup , with UPCN
 2017/2018  Greek Cup , with PAOK
 2017/2018  Bulgarian Cup , with Nefrochimic

National Super Cups
 2014  Italian Super Cup , with Trentino
 2016  Italian Super Cup , with Trentino

References

External links
 profile at FIVB.org

1986 births
Living people
Bulgarian men's volleyball players
Place of birth missing (living people)